The World Trade Center Guadalajara is a building complex in Guadalajara, Jalisco, Mexico. It consists of two 13-story towers joined at the top by an arc. It was founded in 1988 and was redesigned as a tech hub in the 2000s.

References

External links
  – official website
 
 

Guadalajara
Buildings and structures in Guadalajara, Jalisco